Asimenio is a village in the municipality of Didymoteicho in the northern part of the Evros regional unit in Greece. It is about 8 km northeast of the centre of Didymoteicho. It is bypassed by the Greek National Road 51 (Alexandroupoli - Didymoteicho - Orestiada - Ormenio). The nearest larger villages are Sofiko to the north, and Pythio to the southeast.

Population

The village has historically also been settled by Arvanites.

See also
List of settlements in the Evros regional unit

Notes

Populated places in Evros (regional unit)
Didymoteicho
Albanian communities of Western Thrace